Bolshaya Polyana, formerly known in German as  is a rural locality (a settlement) in Znamensky Rural Okrug of Gvardeysky District in Kaliningrad Oblast, Russia.

Notable people
Johannes Blaskowitz (1883-1948) German Wehrmacht general during World War II

Rural localities in Kaliningrad Oblast